Asimina longifolia, the slimleaf pawpaw, is a shrub in the  custard apple family. It is native to the Southeastern United States where it is found on the coastal plain. Its preferred habitat is dry, sandy pinelands.

There are two named varieties:
A. longifolia var. longifolia - Only found in Florida and Georgia.
A. longifolia  var. spatulata - Found from southern Alabama to southern South Carolina.

It is unclear if the two varieties should be considered distinct species. This group is in need of further taxonomic study.

Description
It is a small bush 2 to 3 feet in height.  Prominent features include long narrow leaves, 4 by  inches, and white flowers. Its pollen is shed in permanent tetrads.

References

longifolia
Flora of the Southeastern United States
Endemic flora of the United States
Taxa named by Constantine Samuel Rafinesque
Flora without expected TNC conservation status